En ny jul is the debut studio album by Swedish singer Magnus Carlsson. Released in November 2001, the album, peaked at number 17 on the Swedish Albums Chart.

The album was re-released in 2009 under the title Christmas.

Track listing

2001
 När en stjärna faller
 Mitt vinterland
 It May Be Winter Outside
 Happy X-Mas
 Himmel i advent (No Ordinary World) (Åsa Jinder playing the nyckelharpa)
 Finns det mirakel (duet with Elisabeth Andreassen)
 White Christmas
 All I Want For Christmas Is You
 Änglarna i snön
 Himlens alla stjärnor ser på
 Christmas Time
 Nu är julen här
 Happy, Happy Year For Us All (with Alcazar & Golden Hits-ensemblen)
 It's Just Another New Year's Eve

2009
 När en stjärna faller
 Mitt vinterland
 It May Be Winter Outside
 Happy X-Mas
 Himmel i advent (No Ordinary World) (Åsa Jinder playing the nyckelharpa)
 Finns det mirakel (duet with Elisabeth Andreassen)
 White Christmas
 All I Want For Christmas Is You
 Änglarna i snön
 Himlens alla stjärnor ser på
 Christmas Time
 Nu är julen här
 Happy, Happy Year For Us All (with Alcazar & Golden Hits-ensemblen)
 It's Just Another New Year's Eve
 Bonus track: My Grown-Up Christmas List      
 Bonus track: Låt julen förkunna ("Happy Xmas (War Is Over)" Swedish language-version)
 Bonus track: Jag drömmer om en jul hemma ("White Christmas" Swedish language-version)
 Bonus track: It Is Christmas Night ("Nu är julen här" English language-version)

Charts

Release history

References

2001 albums
Magnus Carlsson albums